"Don't Wake Me Up" is a song by English DJ and record producer Jonas Blue and American boy band Why Don't We, released on 7 January 2022 via 	
Positiva Records. The song was written by Blue, Lukas Costas, Rebecca Krueger and Why Don't We's members Jonah Marais, Corbyn Besson, Daniel Seavey, Jack Avery and Zach Herron, and produced by Blue.

Background and content
Why Don't We contacted Jonas Blue on Twitter in 2019, where Blue praised the band's vocals. Blue said in a press release: "'Don't Wake Me Up' has a real depth to the lyrics. If you break it down, it's about finding your true love in your dream".

Music video
An accompanying music video was released on 28 January 2022, and directed by Isaac Rentz. It depicts an "impromptu" party taking place in a Los Angeles parking lot, and was described by Vents Magazine as featuring "dancing, fast cars and the promise of romance".

Credits and personnel
Credits adapted from Tidal.

 Jonas Blue – producer, composer, lyricist, associated performer, mixer, music production, programming, recording arranger, studio personal
 Why Don't We – composer, lyricist, associated performer, vocals
 Lukas Costas – composer
 Rebecca Krueger – composer
 Mitch Allan – associated performer, vocal producer
 Guy Phethean – keyboards
 Mike Marsh – mastering engineer, studio personal
 Caleb Hulin – studio personal, vocal engineer

Charts

Weekly charts

Year-end charts

Japanese version
On 13 July 2022, a version of "Don't Wake Me Up" featuring Japanese boy band Be:First was released.

References

2022 singles
2022 songs
Jonas Blue songs
Why Don't We songs
Songs written by Jonas Blue
Positiva Records singles